Ibrahim Khalil is a border crossing point between Turkey and Iraq. It is also called the Habur Border or Frontier Gate in English. Before the control point and gate there is a bridge crossing the Khabur river, which forms the natural border between Iraq and Turkey. The crossing is located to the south of the town of Silopi.

Although it is an entry point into Iraq, the crossing is controlled by the Kurdistan Regional Government, which enforced its own customs and immigration policies, enforced at checkpoints staffed by Kurdish Peshmerga fighters under the flag of Kurdistan—a red, white, and green tricolor with a golden sun. In September 2004 the 167th Corps Support Group, a New Hampshire Army Reserve unit, was deployed to Ibrahim Khalil to monitor the supplies being shipped from supply centers in northern Turkey to coalition forces in Iraq.

On 6 December 2015 the border was crossed by ca. 3,000 Turkish soldiers, heading to the Mosul countryside.

Photo gallery

References

Dohuk Governorate
Iraq–Turkey border crossings
Geography of Iraqi Kurdistan
Şırnak Province